Boldrewood Innovation Campus is one of the University of Southampton’s campuses, located in Bassett, Southampton. The newly built campus is a centre where business, research and education coexist in engineering sciences, maritime engineering and other maritime disciplines. The campus is also home to the university’s strategic partner Lloyd’s Register.

Facilities 
Work is still being completed on the Boldrewood campus; it will consist of four buildings with extensive research and teaching facilities.  Currently in use are advanced design studios, wind tunnels, fluids dynamics laboratories, a driving simulator, performance sports laboratory and two unmanned vehicles laboratories.  Facilities that are still in construction include a 186m towing tank and an anechoic wind chamber.

History 
Boldrewood was previously the Biomedical Sciences campus of the University of Southampton, home to the School of Biological Sciences and the non-hospital base for the School of Medicine.  In April 2006, the university announced plans to develop a 'professional campus' on the Boldrewood site, to house the marine services division of Lloyd's Register.  In October 2010, the Boldrewood Campus was fully closed for redevelopment, after the relocation of staff and students to the new Life Sciences building on the Highfield Campus.

Location 
The campus is located to the west of the main Highfield campus, on Burgess Road, Southampton.

References

External links 

 Faculty of Engineering and the Environment, University of Southampton

University of Southampton
University and college campuses in the United Kingdom
Areas of Southampton